The 1995 Miami Hurricanes football team represented the University of Miami during the 1995 NCAA Division I-A football season. It was the Hurricanes' 70th season of football and fifth as a member of the Big East Conference. The Hurricanes were led by first-year head coach Butch Davis and played their home games at the Orange Bowl. They finished the season 8–3 overall and 6–1 in the Big East to finish as conference co-champion. They served a one-year bowl ban due to NCAA sanctions that were levied at the end of the season.

Schedule

Personnel

Coaching staff

Support staff

Roster

Statistics

Passing

Rushing

Receiving

Game summaries

UCLA

Florida A&M

Virginia Tech

Florida State

Rutgers

Pitt

Temple

Baylor

Boston College

West Virginia

Syracuse

1996 NFL Draft

References

Miami
Miami Hurricanes football seasons
Miami Hurricanes football